The William Waterfield House, also known as the Waterfield Octagon House, is a historic building located in Raymond, Iowa, United States. Built in 1867, it was added to the National Register of Historic Places on October 19, 1978. Waterfield was a New Jersey native who settled in Iowa in 1856 as a farmer, eventually operating a hotel in Raymond, possibly in this house. He was a student of phrenology and as a result he built this octagon house. The house is capped with an unusual hipped roof that is formed by extending its east and west roof planes.

References

National Register of Historic Places in Black Hawk County, Iowa
Houses on the National Register of Historic Places in Iowa
Houses in Black Hawk County, Iowa
Octagon houses in Iowa
Houses completed in 1867